Amaya Uranga Amezaga (born 18 February 1947) is a Spanish singer from Bilbao, best known for the 15 years she spent as a member of the Basque folk/pop sextet Mocedades. She is a cousin of director Pablo Berger.

Biography
Uranga formed Mocedades in 1969 with eight members. After numerous group changes, Uranga together with her sister Izaskun, her brother Roberto, and three other male members became the so-called "historic six" members of Mocedades who came second in the 1973 Eurovision Song Contest with the song "Eres Tú", and the band subsequently launched a hugely successful music career in Spain and Latin America.

She was lead singer on many of Mocedades' most successful songs, such as the international smash hit "Eres Tú" and "Tómame o Déjame."

Solo career
Uranga left Mocedades in 1984 to pursue a solo career, although she failed to surpass her success in Mocedades. In the mid-1990s, Uranga joined a new band called El Consorcio. She has also appeared as herself many times on Spanish-language television shows. Amaya performed from a wheelchair in 2011 after breaking her femur.

References

External links 
 Sergio y Estíbaliz website
 El Consorcio website

1947 births
Basque-language singers
Living people
People from Bilbao
Basque singers
Spanish women singers